The Mechanic may refer to:

The Mechanic (1972 film), a 1972 film starring Charles Bronson
The Mechanic (2011 film), a 2011 remake starring Jason Statham
"The Mechanic" (Batman: The Animated Series), a 1993 episode of Batman: The Animated Series
The Mechanic (Transformers), a fictional character
"The Mechanic", a nickname of golfer Miguel Ángel Jiménez

See also
 Mechanic (disambiguation)
The Mechanik, a 2005 film starring Dolph Lundgren